Li Zhaoyi (born 25 August 1994) is a Chinese taekwondo practitioner. 

She won a silver medal in finweight at the 2011 World Taekwondo Championships, after being defeated by Kim So-hui in the final. She won a silver medal at the 2012 Asian Taekwondo Championships, and a silver medal at the 2014 Asian Games.

References

External links

1994 births
Living people
People from Xinjiang
Sportspeople from Xinjiang
Chinese female taekwondo practitioners
Taekwondo practitioners at the 2014 Asian Games
Asian Games medalists in taekwondo
Medalists at the 2014 Asian Games
Asian Games silver medalists for China
World Taekwondo Championships medalists
Asian Taekwondo Championships medalists
21st-century Chinese women